Lachesilla meinanderi is a species of Psocoptera from the Lachesillidae family that is endemic to the Canary Islands. The habitat of Lachesilla meinanderi is terrestrial.

References

Lachesillidae
Insects described in 1938
Endemic fauna of the Canary Islands
Insects of the Canary Islands